Zhensheng Expressway connects Zhenning County and tourist attraction Shengjingguan in the Chinese province of Guizhou. It is part of Hukun Expressway.

Expressways in China
Transport in Guizhou